A binding knot is a knot that may be used to keep an object or multiple loose objects together, using a string or a rope that passes at least once around them.  There are various binding knots, divided into two types.  Friction knots are held in place by the friction between the windings of line.  Knotted-ends knots are held in place by the two ends of the line being knotted together.

Whipping and seizing are binding knots, but are more complex since they contain many turns, like a lashing.

This is a list of binding knots.
Boa knot
Bottle sling
Constrictor knot
Corned beef knot
Granny knot
Ground-line hitch
Miller's knot
Packer's knot
Reef knot
Strangle knot
Surgeon's knot
Thief knot
Jamming knot
Sheet bend
Sheepshank
Common whipping

See also
List of bend knots
List of knots
Rope splicing

References

 
Scoutcraft